The Appomattox Court House National Historical Park ruins are part of the Appomattox Court House National Historical Park, Virginia which was listed on the National Register of Historic Places on October 15, 1966.

Old county jail

R.J. N. Williams cabin ruin

McDearmon–Tibbs–Scott house ruin
Samuel D. McDearmon purchased the undeveloped  "Clover Hill" tract from Hugh Raine in 1846, cutting off  for a county seat for the new Appomattox county.  In 1849 he began improving the now  property adding $1,056 worth of buildings.  By 1851 he had made improvements totaling $2,800, likely indicating that the mansion house had been completed.  This chronology also corresponds to his known political and financial zenith. Although he offered the tract for sale in October 1854, Jacob Tibbs did not purchase McDearmon's property until 1856 and then only  of it, which included the $2800 "improvements."  The following year Tibbs's "improvements" had been reduced to $2000.

Tinsley–Scott Tenant House Ruin #1-West

Tinsley–Scott Tenant House Ruin #2-East

Coleman house ruin

Sweeney dam ruin and mill race

Footnotes

References
 Bradford, Ned, Battles and Leaders of the Civil War, Plume, 1989
 Catton, Bruce, A Stillness at Appomattox, Doubleday 1953, Library of Congress # 53-9982, 
 Catton, Bruce, This Hallowed Ground, Doubleday 1953, Library of Congress # 56-5960
 Chaffin, Tom, 2006.  Sea of Gray: The Around-the-World Odyssey of the Confederate Raider Shenandoah, Hill and Wang/Farrar, Straus and Giroux,.
 Davis, Burke, The Civil War: Strange & Fascinating Facts, Wings Books, 1960 & 1982, 
 Davis, Burke, To Appomattox – Nine April Days, 1865, Eastern Acorn Press, 1992,           
 Featherston, Nathaniel Ragland, Appomattox County History and Genealogy, Genealogical Publishing Company, 1998, 
 Gutek, Patricia, Plantations and Outdoor Museums in America's Historic South, University of South Carolina Press, 1996, 
 Kaiser, Harvey H., The National Park Architecture Sourcebook, Princeton Architectural Press, 2008, 
 Kennedy, Frances H., The Civil War Battlefield Guide, Houghton Mifflin Company, 1990, 
 Korn, Jerry et al., The Civil War, Pursuit to Appomattox, The Last Battles, Time-Life Books, 1987, 
 Marvel, William, A Place Called Appomattox, UNC Press, 2000, 
 Marvel, William, Lee's Last Retreat, UNC Press, 2006, 
 McPherson, James M., Battle Cry of Freedom, Oxford University Press, 1988, 
 National Park Service, Appomattox Court House: Appomattox Court House National Historical Park, Virginia, U.S. Dept. of the Interior, 2002,  
 Tidwell, William A., April '65: Confederate Covert Action in the American Civil War, Kent State University Press, 1995, 
 Weigley, Russel F., A Great Civil War: A Military and Political History, 1861–1865, Indiana University Press, 2000, 

Appomattox Court House National Historical Park
Historic district contributing properties in Virginia
Slave cabins and quarters in the United States